"Only" is a song by American heavy metal band Anthrax off their 1993 album Sound of White Noise. It is one of their most popular songs from the John Bush era, and has also appeared on their compilation album, Return of the Killer A's. Metallica frontman James Hetfield called "Only" "a perfect song".

Personnel
John Bush – lead vocals
Dan Spitz – lead guitar
Scott Ian – rhythm guitar, backing vocals
Frank Bello – bass guitar, backing vocals
Charlie Benante – drums

Single
The song was issued as a two-CD set featuring alternate color schemes of the single's artwork, one the regular color and the other would be green. It was also issued on picture disc and as a maxi single.

Track listing (part 2 of a 2-CD set)
1. "Only (LP Mix)"
2. "Auf Wiedersehen" (Cheap Trick cover)
3. "Noisegate"

Track listing (maxi single, picture disc, CD 1)
1. "Only (Radio Edit)"
2. "Cowboy Song" (Thin Lizzy cover)
3. "Sodium Pentathol"

* "Sodium Pentathol" also appears on the album Sound of White Noise and is labeled "C11 H17 N2 O2 S Na" there.

Charts

References

1993 singles
Anthrax (American band) songs
1992 songs
Songs written by John Bush (musician)
Elektra Records singles
Songs written by Dan Spitz
Songs written by Scott Ian
Songs written by Frank Bello
Songs written by Charlie Benante
Alternative metal songs